Richard Hall was an Australian cricketer. He played two first-class matches for New South Wales between 1880/81 and 1883/84.

See also
 List of New South Wales representative cricketers

References

External links
 

Year of birth missing
Year of death missing
Australian cricketers
New South Wales cricketers
Place of birth missing